Barbara Howard (born 1956) is an American psychotherapist and retired actress, who remains best known for her roles in the film Friday the 13th: The Final Chapter and in the television series Falcon Crest as Melissa Agretti's cousin Robin Agretti. She retired from acting in 2000 to pursue her current career in psychotherapy.

Early life
Howard was born in Chicago, Illinois and grew up in Palatine, Illinois. She graduated from William Fremd High School in 1974, and later graduated from the University of Utah with a Bachelor of Fine Arts degree before going to England to study acting at Richmond, The American International University in London.

Career
Howard began her career in Chicago area theater before moving to Los Angeles in April 1983 to pursue a career in acting there. She made her film debut in Racing with the Moon before landing a more significant role in Friday the 13th: The Final Chapter. In 1985 she landed the role of Robin Agretti on Falcon Crest but opted to leave the following year to pursue more film roles and Broadway roles in New York.

Filmography

Film

Television

References

External links

Living people
American film actresses
American television actresses
Actresses from Chicago
American psychotherapists
1956 births
21st-century American actresses